Tsarevich is a Slavic title given to tsars' sons. Under the 1797 Pauline house law, the title was discontinued and replaced with Tsesarevich for the heir apparent alone. His younger brothers were called Velikiy Knjaz, meaning Grand Prince, although it was commonly translated to English as Grand Duke. English sources often confused the terms Tsarevich and Tsesarevich.

Alexei Nikolaevich, the only son of Nicholas II, was the last member of Russian royalty to be called Tsarevich even though he was the Tsesarevich.

Historically, the term was also applied to descendants of the khans (tsars) of Kazan, Kasimov, and Siberia after these khanates had been conquered by Russia. See: Tsareviches of Siberia, for example. The descendants of the deposed royal families of Georgia or the Batonishvili were given the titles of Tsarevich until 1833 when they were demoted to Knyaz after a failed coup to restore the Georgian monarchies.

See also
 Tsarevna
 Tsesarevich

Notes

References

 
Noble titles of Russia
Russian royalty